The Battle of Oldendorf on 8 July 1633  was fought as part of the Thirty Years' War between the Swedish Empire with its Protestant German allies and the Holy Roman Empire near Hessisch-Oldendorf, Lower Saxony, Germany. The result was a decisive victory for the Swedish Army and its allies.

Prelude
The Landgrave of Hesse-Kassel, William V, as a Protestant ally of Sweden had campaigned in Westphalia, Ruhr area and the Sauerland, successfully reducing the imperial presence there. The imperial defense of the Weser area in 1633 was led by Jost Maximilian von Gronsfeld.

The battle was preceded by a Swedish siege of the nearby imperial-held town of Hameln, laid in March 1633 with support of Hessian and Lüneburgian troops.

Battle

On 8 July, the Swedish army commanded by George, Duke of Brunswick-Lüneburg and Marshal Dodo zu Innhausen und Knyphausen faced an Imperial relief army commanded by Field Marshal Jobst Maximilian von Gronsfeld, Count John of Merode and Lothar Dietrich Freiherr von Bönninghausen. Merode commanded 4,450 infantrymen and 1,245 cavalry troops, Bonninghausen 4,475 infantry and 2,060 cavalry, Gronsfeld 2,000 infantry and 600 cavalry. The armies met near Hessisch-Oldendorf, northwest of Hameln.

Both armies attacked, a rare event in the Thirty Years' War, which besides Oldendorf only occurred in the Second Battle of Breitenfeld. The left wing of the Swedish forces was commanded by the general of Landgraviate of Hesse-Kassel and later imperial field marshal Peter Melander. Subsequently, field marshal Torsten Stålhandske led a Swedish brigade. The later field marshal Gottfried Huyn von Geleen participated in the battle on the imperial side.

Gronsfeld was captured after his wing was routed by Melander, leaving over 3,000 dead and wounded and 1,000 prisoner. The Swedes lost 700 soldiers.

Aftermath
The Swedish victory in Oldendorf and the subsequent victory in the Battle of Pfaffenhofen on 11 August balanced their defeat in the Battle of Steinau on 10 October. Overall, Swedish and Imperial forces were "on even terms" in 1633. This only changed in the following year. While the Swedish forces won the Battle of Liegnitz on 8 May and the Battle of Landshut on 22 July, their defeat in the Battle of Nördlingen on 6 September 1634 brought about a change in the balance of power.

Melander, the Swedish commander at Oldendorf, intrigued with the Holy Roman Emperor in 1635 to merge Hesse-Kassel's forces into the Imperial army and have Hesse-Kassel sign the Peace of Prague. These plans failed, and personal quarrels led him to leave service in 1640 and to re-enter it as the Imperial commander of Westphalia in 1645. The Peace of Prague reconciled many Protestant states with the Holy Roman Emperor, most notably the Electorate of Saxony. As a consequence, Sweden's and Hesse-Kassel's forces stood alone against a growing anti-Swedish, pro-Habsburg coalition in 1635 - a disequilibrium eventually stirring France's intervention in the Thirty Years' War.

In 1647, Hessisch-Oldendorf became the winter quarters of the Swedish army commanded by Carl Gustaf Wrangel retreating from Bohemia, followed by the then imperial commander Melander who took his quarters in Hesse.

Gallery

Notes

Sources

References

Bibliography

External links

1633 in Europe
Oldendorf 1633
Oldendorf 1633
Oldendorf 1633
Oldendorf